The Fight Between the Snipe and the Clam, also translated as Snipe–Clam Grapple, is a 1983 Chinese animated short film directed by Hu Jinqing and produced by the Shanghai Animation Film Studio. It won the Silver Bear for Best Short Film at the Berlin International Film Festival in February 1984.

Background
The film is based on the Chinese proverb "in the fight between the snipe and the clam, the fisherman has the best of it".

Plot
A clam is sitting out in the sun when suddenly a snipe flies down to peck at it.  The clam slams its shells shut, gripping the snipe's beak in between.  The snipe says, "If it doesn't rain today, and it doesn't rain tomorrow, I shall see a dead clam on the beach."  The clam retorts, "If I don't open today, and I don't open up tomorrow, I shall see a dead snipe on the beach."  While they are grappling with each other, a fisherman passes by and nets them both.

Credits

See also
 Chinese animation

References

External links
 
 The film at China's Movie Database

1983 animated films
1983 films
1980s animated short films
Chinese animated short films